Christopher Godet (born 30 March 1998) is a Bahamian footballer who plays for Cubs FC and the Bahamas national football team.

International career
Godet made his senior international debut on 25 March 2015 in a 5–0 home defeat to Bermuda during World Cup qualification.

Personal life
Godet is the son of Bahamas national football team coach Dion Godet. Godet is also a youth soccer referee and has a D-level coaching badge. In June 2015, Godet met Cristiano Ronaldo at the One & Only Ocean Club in The Bahamas.

References

External links

Profile at Mount Aloysius Athletics

1998 births
Living people
Bahamian footballers
Bahamas international footballers
Association football defenders
Sportspeople from Nassau, Bahamas